Vidovicia is a monotypic genus of gastropods belonging to the family Helicidae. The only species is Vidovicia caerulans.

The species is found in Southern Europe.

References

Helicidae